Mount Payer is a peak in the Yamalo-Nenets Autonomous Okrug, Russia. It is the highest point of the okrug and of the Polar Urals, as well as one of the highest of the wider Ural mountain system.

The name of the mountain originated in the Nenets language "pai/er" (пай/ер), meaning "rock/master".

Description
It rises in the middle part of the range, in Shuryshkarsky District, near the border of the Komi Republic. 

See also
 List of highest points of Russian federal subjects
 List of mountains and hills of Russia

References

External links
Восхождение на гору Пайер (1472 м), высшую точку Полярного Урала в рамках туристического проекта Корона Урала. (Climbing Mount Payer)

Payer
Landforms of Yamalo-Nenets Autonomous Okrug